Rambin is a surname. Notable people with the surname include:

Leven Rambin (born 1990), American actress
Melvin Rambin (1941–2001), American banker and politician

French-language surnames